Love Serenade is a 1996 Australian comedy film written and directed by Shirley Barrett. It has the tagline: "Two sisters will do anything to hook the right man".

There are not many characters in Love Serenade, which is set in a fictitious, almost-deserted town called Sunray, located on the Murray River. It is a thinly disguised version of Robinvale, Victoria, which was the location of the film.

The film is about a pair of sisters, Dimity (Miranda Otto) and Vicki-Ann (Rebecca Frith), who share a house. Dimity, the shy and insecure sibling, is a waitress at a local Chinese restaurant. Vicki-Ann, the brash one, is a hair stylist. Both are looking for love, although the prospects in Sunray seem bleak, at best. That is, until Ken Sherry (George Shetsov), a thrice divorced Brisbane DJ personality, moves into the house next door.

During the filming of the Silo Scene, Stuntman Collin Dragsbaek died when he fell onto a faulty airbag.

Cast
 Miranda Otto – Dimity Hurley
 Rebecca Frith – Vicki-Ann Hurley
 George Shevtsov – Kenneth 'Ken' Sherry
 John Alansu – Albert Lee
 Jessica Napier – Deborah 'Debbie'
 Jill McWilliam – Curler Victim
 Ryan Jackson – Boy on Bike (Ride)
 Sabrina Norris – Beautiful Baby

Awards
The film was screened in the Un Certain Regard section at the 1996 Cannes Film Festival, where it won the Caméra d'Or.

Box office
Love Serenade grossed $836,110 at the box office in Australia.

See also
 Cinema of Australia

References

External links
 
 Love Serenade at Oz Movies
 Love Serenade at Rotten Tomatoes
 Love Serenade at the National Film and Sound Archive

1996 films
1996 comedy films
Australian comedy films
1990s English-language films
Films directed by Shirley Barrett
Caméra d'Or winners
Films shot in Victoria (Australia)
Miramax films